Desmond Clark is an American football player.

Desmond Clark may also refer to:

J. Desmond Clark (1916–2002), British archaeologist
Des Clark (born 1972), Australian rugby league player
Desmond Clark (mayor) on List of mayors and lord mayors of Melbourne

See also 
 Desmond Clarke (disambiguation)